The McAllen–Edinburg–Mission Metropolitan Statistical Area (MSA), is a U.S. metropolitan statistical area defined by the United States Census Bureau, consisting of one county – Hidalgo – in the Rio Grande Valley region of South Texas, anchored by the cities of McAllen, Edinburg, Pharr and Mission. It is ranked the fifth most populated metropolitan area in the state of Texas. It is also part of the transnational metropolitan area of Reynosa–McAllen.

Demographics 
As of the 2000 census, the MSA had a population of 569,463 (though a July 1, 2009 estimate placed the population at 741,152). According to the 2010 census, the population had reached 774,769. This population increase of 36.05% places it as the 11th fastest growing metropolitan statistic area from 2000 to 2010. As of the 2020 census, the population grew to 870,781

It has the lowest per capita income of the 276 MSAs within the 50 states at $9,899. Its median household income is also the lowest within the 50 states at $24,863. In a survey done in over 190 metropolitan areas it had the highest obesity rate of residents at 38.8 percent. Today, the states with the highest poverty rates (of over 20 million living on $2 a day) are all in the southern part of the country (Table 1) [7], and the nation's poorest large metropolitan area is McAllen-Edinburg-Mission, Texas.

Counties
 Hidalgo

Communities

Cities

Census-designated places
Note: All census-designated places are unincorporated.

Unincorporated places
 El Gato
 Hargill
 Runn
 Val Verde

See also
 Texas census statistical areas
 Reynosa–McAllen Metropolitan Area

References

Metropolitan areas of Texas
Populated places in Hidalgo County, Texas
Edinburg, Texas
McAllen, Texas
Mission, Texas
Lower Rio Grande Valley
Geography of Hidalgo County, Texas
Geography of McAllen, Texas